The Abbreviacion of Statutis (1519), of which fifteen editions appeared before 1625, is a book by John Rastell.  It, and Termes de la Ley, are the best known of his legal works.

It is said to be the first abridgement of the Statutes printed in English. It appears to be a translation with additions of the Abridgment des Statutes vieux.

References

Law books
1519 in law
1519 books
English non-fiction books
Parliament of England